Björnen sover is a Swedish singing game, used both as a round dance and a children's song. The tune is a simplified version of the one used for  Gubben Noak, published by Carl Michael Bellman, published in Songs of Fredman in 1792. Still today (1999), research hasn't proved if Bellman wrote the tune or not. Since it became famous, the tune been used for several different lyrics in the centuries since Bellman, including many children's songs.

The game

One person is appointed  bear, taking cover and pretending to sleep
Other participants walk around the "bear" in a ring, singing Björnen sover (the "bear is sleeping").
At the end of the song, the bear "wakes up", and begins to chase the other participants.
When someone is caught, he or she will become the "bear" the next time.

Russia and the USSR

Because Russia and the USSR sometimes have been called the Russian Bear the term björnen sover ("the bear sleeps") has in Swedish sometimes referred to times in international politics when Russia has attracted less attention, but not everyone is trusting them.

Recordings

An early recording with Kjell Lönnå with children from "Riddaren's Kindergarten" in Sundsvall appeared on the 1982 album Gnola och sjung.

References

Sources

 

Swedish children's songs
Songwriter unknown
Year of song unknown